Tsuyoshi "Hunk" Garret, known as  or by his nickname  in the original Japanese language Beast King GoLion, is a fictional character in the media franchise Voltron, and a member of the Voltron Force. The character's first appearance was in Voltron.

Voltron: Defender of the Universe

Hunk was part of an exploratory team, sent by the Galaxy Alliance and led by Keith, that were kidnapped by the forces of Planet Doom.

After he and the others escaped Planet Doom, went to the Castle of Lions on Planet Arus, where they met Princess Allura and Coran and were designated as the Voltron Force.

Voltron Force

Hunk is a mechanic and Voltron Force member. His weapon is the claw hammer. Hunk is a member of Galaxy Garrison. His rank is Tech Sergeant

Voltron: Legendary Defender
In Voltron: Legendary Defender, Hunk is the paladin of the Yellow Lion, one of five lions that form Voltron, and he is a Samoan.

Comics

In the 2011 Devil's Due comics, the Hunk character is referred to as Tsuyoshi "Hunk" Garrett. The comic book version of Hunk depicts him as 24 and born to an American father and Japanese mother. His nickname "Hunk" comes from his 4 brothers, of whom he's ironically the smallest, despite his own great size. While his brothers sought activities to take advantage of their physical prowess such as football and sumo, Hunk found a knack for all things mechanical. He was not very social, though, and would spend most of his time tinkering in garage workshops. Later he put himself through college on the G.I. bill, and after gaining a Master's in engineering, he discovered the equipment that fascinated him most was military in nature. However, he remained rather anti-social, establishing himself as someone who it was unwise to harass, until he was approached by Colonel Hawkins to join a team of outcasts to search for the legendary robot Voltron on the distant planet Arus.

References

Television characters introduced in 1981
Television characters introduced in 1984
Television characters introduced in 2016
Voltron
Male characters in animation
Fictional military personnel
Fictional Asian-American people
Fictional Samoan people